Wolfe was a former provincial electoral district in the Estrie region of Quebec, Canada.

It was created for the 1890 election from part of Richmond-Wolfe electoral district.  Its final election was in 1970.  It disappeared in the 1973 election and its successor electoral districts were Frontenac, Mégantic-Compton and Richmond.

Wolfe was named in honour of General James Wolfe, who led the English side in the Battle of the Plains of Abraham.

Members of the Legislative Assembly / National Assembly
 Jacques Picard, Conservative Party (1890–1892)
 Jérôme-Adolphe Chicoyne, Conservative Party (1892–1904)
 Napoléon-Pierre Tanguay, Liberal (1904–1919)
 Joseph-Eugène Rhéault, Liberal (1919–1921)
 Joseph-Pierre-Cyrénus Lemieux, Liberal (1921–1933)
 Thomas-Hercule Lapointe, Liberal (1933–1936)
 Henri Vachon, Union Nationale (1936–1939)
 Thomas-Hercule Lapointe, Liberal (1939–1944)
 Henri Vachon, Union Nationale (1944–1952)
 Gérard Lemieux, Liberal (1952–1956)
 Henri Vachon, Union Nationale (1956–1960)
 Gerard Lemieux, Liberal (1960–1962)
 René Lavoie, Union Nationale (1962–1973)

References
 Election results (National Assembly)
 Election results (QuebecPolitique.com)

Wolfe